Reverend Dr Kaptein Hendrik Witbooi (traditional name ǃNanseb ǀGabemab, 7 January 1934, in Gibeon – 13 October 2009, in Windhoek) was a Namibian politician and the seventh Captain of the ǀKhowesin clan. A member of SWAPO from 1976 until his death, Witbooi brought with him several clans of Namaqua into the liberation organisation.

Imprisoned numerous times during the Namibian War of Independence, Witbooi was first elected as Vice-President of SWAPO in 1984 and was re-elected for the last time in 1997. A member of the Constituent Assembly in 1989–90, Witbooi served in the National Assembly until his 2004 retirement, including a stint (1990-1995) as Minister of Labour and Manpower Development.

Witbooi became Namibia's first Deputy Prime Minister in 1995. He served in that position until 2004.

In October 2009 Witbooi was facing major medical problems and had slipped into a coma at the Roman Catholic Hospital in Windhoek. He died on 13 October due to cancer.

Personal

Witbooi was the great-grandson of Hendrik Witbooi, the early resistance leader who led his chiefly followers against European colonisation.

References

1934 births
2009 deaths
People from Hardap Region
Members of the National Assembly (Namibia)
Nama people
Namibian chiefs
Deaths from cancer in Namibia
SWAPO politicians
Labour ministers of Namibia